The Robert Guillaume Show is an American sitcom television series starring Robert Guillaume that aired on ABC from April 5 to August 1, 1989.

Synopsis
The series starred Guillaume as Edward Sawyer, a single father with two children who begins an interracial relationship with Ann (Wendy Phillips), his white secretary who has a daughter of her own.

According to Guillaume's autobiography, he conceived the series with the intent of exploring racial complexities in a family situation in a comedic way, but was warned by ABC that the American public needed time to get used to the idea of an interracial romance. Guillaume maintained that ABC deliberately sabotaged the series by airing episodes out of order and showed a kiss between Edward and Ann on the second episode instead of the intended eighth. The series was soon canceled lasting only thirteen episodes.

Cast
 Robert Guillaume as Edward Sawyer
 Marc Joseph as William Sawyer
 Kelsey Scott as Pamela Sawyer
 Hank Rolike as Henry Sawyer
 Wendy Phillips as Ann Sherr

Episodes

References

External links
 

1989 American television series debuts
1989 American television series endings
1980s American sitcoms
1980s American black sitcoms
American Broadcasting Company original programming
Television series by New World Television
English-language television shows
Television series about families
Television shows set in Missouri
Fiction about interracial romance